Boys & Girls Club may refer to:

 Boys & Girls Clubs of America
 Boys & Girls Clubs of Canada
 Gloria Wise Boys and Girls Clubs, Bronx, United States
 Essex Boys and Girls Clubs, in Essex and East London, England
 The Boys' and Girls' Clubs Association of Hong Kong
 Boys & Girls Clubs of Philadelphia

See also
 Boys Club (disambiguation)
 Girls Club (disambiguation)
 Girls Club of America, formerly the "Girls Club of America"
 Dining clubs
 Student society